This is a list of ontologies that are part of the OBO Foundry as of January 2020.

OBO Foundry ontologies

References 

OBO Foundry ontologies
Ontology (information science)